Sydney Lea (born December 22, 1942) is an American poet, novelist, essayist, editor, and professor. He was the founding editor of the New England Review and was the Poet Laureate of Vermont from 2011 to 2015. Lea's writings focus the outdoors, woods, and rural life New England and "the mysteries and teachings of the natural world."

Early life 
Sydney Lea was born in Chestnut Hill, Pennsylvania. Growing up, his father had a camp in Washington County, Maine.

Lea attended Yale University, graduating with a B.A. in 1964. While there, he was a member of the social and literary fraternity, St. Anthony Hall. Later, he received a Ph.D. in comparative literature from Yale. Robert Penn Warren was his mentor.

Career 
Lea taught at Dartmouth College from 1969 to 1976. He then taught at Middlebury College from 1976 to 1989 and at Yale University in 1979. He was a professor in the MFA program at the Vermont College of Fine Arts from 1989 to 2002. However, during that time, he also taught at Eotvos Lorand University in Budapest, Hungary while on a Fulbright Scholarship in 1992, at Wesleyan University in 1997, and at Franklin College in Lugano, Switzerland in 2001. He returned to Dartmouth from 1999 to 2002, becoming a professor in its graduate program in liberal studies from 2003 to 2011.

In 1977, Lea co-founded the New England Review with Jay Parini in and edited it until 1989. His work has appeared in literary journals and magazines including The New Yorker, The Atlantic, The Los Angeles Review, The New Republic, The New York Times, Sports Illustrated, and Virginia Quarterly Review.

In 1987, Lea received a Guggenheim Fellowship for poetry. In 1996, his poetry collection To the Bone: New and Selected Poems was co-winner of the Poets' Prize. His collection of poetry Pursuit of the Wound, published in 2000, was a Pulitzer Prize finalist.

Lea became Poet Laureate of Vermont in 2011. The Advisory Committee who recommended him for the four-year position found "Lea's poetry to be virtuosic in texture and form, yet likely to be engaging to a diversity of readers and listeners because of the work's dramatic intensity, narrative momentum, and musicality, and because of this poet's extraordinarily evocative descriptions of northern New England's landscapes, animal and plant life, and the seasonal panorama." The committee also said, "Through all of his books, Lea has paid particular attention to the stories of generations living alongside one another in north-country villages, including the interactions of 'old-timers' and relative newcomers. He continues the tradition of Vermont poets who are both singular—one of a kind—and broadly accessible."

In a review of his 2013 poetry collection, I Was Thinking of Beauty, Jacqueline Kolosov notes, "For Lea, the moral and aesthetic cannot be separated. Though he is honest about his flaws and shortcomings in his poetry—one reason he quickly wins and sustains his readers' trust—his poems strive to teach us how to live while making us laugh at our need to take ourselves so seriously."

His work across the genres has appeared in some sixty anthologies. the composer Joseph Hallman turned Lea's poem "Mudtime" into a long-form song cycle for voice and string quartet. Lea described as "a high point of my term as poet laureate. It was so refreshing and so different, a great shot in the arm." It premiered in 2014 by Hallman's long term collaborator, Abigail Haynes-Lennox and the 802 Quartet at the Vermont College of Fine Arts. Lea has since collaborated with the Vermont Contemporary Music Ensemble on a number of multimedia presentations.

Lea's thirteenth collection of poetry, Here, was published by Four Way Books in 2019. In a review of Here, Publishers Weekly writes, "Lea weaves a graceful tapestry of personal history while expressing his trademark wonder at the natural world in his quietly powerful 13th collection. His memories are not grand in scale; he recalls watching his daughter spill a glass of milk on a train, teaching his son to ride a bike, and schoolboy shenanigans such as a “slew of idiot tricks” pulled on a Latin instructor—yet these scenes become significant through Lea’s telling."

His 2020 book, The Exquisite Triumph of Wormboy, is a graphic mock-epic poem in collaboration with former Vermont Cartoonist Laureate James Kochalka. Released in 2021, Seen From All Sides is a collection of newspaper essays Lea wrote between 2011 and 2015 while he was the Poet Laureate of Vermont.

In 2021, Lea received the Governor's Award for Excellence from the Vermont Arts Council. This award "is reserved for artists both distinguished in their field, and who have had a profound impact on the state of Vermont."

Honors and awards
 2021, Governor's Award for Excellence in the Arts, Vermont Arts Council
 2012: Conservation Hero, Field and Stream magazine
 2011 Poet Laureate of Vermont
 2001 Pulitzer Prize for Poetry finalist for Pursuit of a Wound
 1998 Poets' Prize, for To the Bone: New and Selected Poems
 1992 Fulbright Scholarship, Eotvos Lorand University, Budapest
 1987 Guggenheim Fellowship, Siena, Italy
 1985 Rockefeller Foundation Fellowship, Bellagio Center

Personal life 
In the early 1990s, Lea moved to Vermont. He lives in Newbury, Vermont and has a camp in Washington County, Maine. He has five adult children.

He has served as the vice president of Central Vermont Adult Basic Education. He is also active in the conservation effort in Washington County, Maine, helping to raise funds for the Downeast Lakes Land Trust. He is currently a trustee emeritus of the Vermont College of Fine Arts.

He plays the blues harmonica.

Published works

Full-Length Poetry Collections 
 Here. Four Way Books, 2019. 
 No Doubt the Nameless. Four Way Books, 2016. .
 I Was Thinking of Beauty. Four Way Books, 2013. 
 Six Sundays toward a Seventh: Selected Spiritual Poems. Cascade Books, 2012. 
 Young of the Year. Four Way Books, 2011. 
 Under Drum Ice, A Selection of Poems in Slovenian, translation by Marjan Strojan. 2006
 Ghost Pain: Poems. Sarabande Books, 2005. 
 Pursuit of a Wound. University of Illinois Press, 2000. 
 To the Bone: New and Selected Poems. University of Illinois Press, 1996. 
 
 Prayer for the Little City: Poems. Scribner's, 1989. .
 No Sign. University of Georgia Press,1987. 
 To the Summer Sweethearts. Press at Colorado College, 1985.
 The Floating Candles: Poems. University of Illinois Press, 1982 
 Searching the Drowned Man. University of Illinois Press, 1980.

Children's Poetry Books 
 The Exquisite Triumph of Wormboy. Illustrated by  James Kochalka. Word/Galaxy, 2020.

Novels 
   1st edition Scribner's 1989

Essay Collections 
 Seen From All Sides: Lyric and Everyday Life. Green Writers Press, 2021. 
 Growing Old in Poetry: Two Poets, Two Lives. with Fleda Brown. Green Writers Press. 2018. 
 What’s the Story? Reflections on a Life Grown Long. Green Writers Press, 2015. 
 A North Country Life: Tales of Woodsmen, Waters, and Wildlife. Skyhorse/Simon & Schuster, 2013. 
 A Hundred Himalayas: Essays on Life and Literature. University of Michigan, 2012, 
 
 Hunting the Whole Way Home: Essays and Poems. Lyons Press, 2002. 
 Gothic to Fantastic: Readings in Supernatural Fiction. Ayer Publishing, 1980.

Essays 
 "Sixty Steps from Yale." Numéro Cinq. vol. 7, no. 6, June 2016.
 "River, Stars, and Blessed Failure" Numéro Cinq. vol. 6, no. 2, February 2015.
 "The Serpent on Barnet Knoll: Three Essays." Numéro Cinq. vol. 5, no. 6, June 2014.
 "Sex & Death: Essay on the Uncanny." Numéro Cinq. vol. 5, no. 2, February 2014.
 "Mrs. Ragnetti and the Spider: Essay." Numéro Cinq. vol. 4, no. 10, October 2013.
 "Pony and Graveyard: A Dream of the Flesh." Numéro Cinq. vol. 4, no. 2, February 2013.
 "A Short Sad Story: Essay." Numéro Cinq. vol. 3, no. 12, December 2012.
 "Becoming a Poet: A Way to Know." Numéro Cinq. vol. 3, no. 9, September 2012.
 "Unskunked: An Essay." Numéro Cinq. vol. 3, no. 3, March 2012.
 "Weathers and Places: Essay." Numéro Cinq. vol. 2, no. 3, March 2011.
 "The Pragmatist's Prayer." Image Journal. Issue 55, 2005.
 "Introduction." The Breath of Parted Lips: Voices from Robert Frost Place, Volume 2. CavanKerry Press, 2004. 
 "Living with the Stories: Bonness Verbatim." Prairie Schooner, vol. 70, no. 1, Spring 1996, p. 160.
 "The Death Of A Hunting Dog", Sports Illustrated, December 2, 1991.

Short Stories 
 "Mercy on Beeson's Partridge." The Virginia Quarterly Review, vol. 70, no. 3, 1994, pp. 541–55.
 “Presences.” Prairie Schooner, vol. 64, no. 1, 1990, pp. 74–83.

Anthology Publications 
 "Inviting the Moose: A Vision." Poets of the New Century. Editors Roger Weingarten and Richard Higgerson. David R. Godine, 2003. p. 208.

Anthologies Edited 
The Bread Loaf Anthology of Contemporary American Poetry. with Robert Pack and Jay Parini. University Press of New England, 1985. 
The Nomads: Tales From Africa. with Morgan Chipopu. Zambian P.E.N. Center, 2006.
The Burdens of Formality: Essays on the Poetry of Anthony Hecht. University of Georgia Press, 1988.

Personal life 
In the early 1990s, Lea moved to Vermont. He lives in Newbury, Vermont and has a camp in Washington County, Maine. He has five adult children.

He has served as the vice president of Central Vermont Adult Basic Education. He is also active in the conservation effort in Washington County, Maine, helping to raise funds for the Downeast Lakes Land Trust. He is currently a trustee emeritus at the Vermont College of Fine Arts.

He play blues harmonica.

References

1942 births
Living people
People from Newbury, Vermont
Yale University alumni
St. Anthony Hall
20th-century American novelists
Poets Laureate of Vermont
Novelists from Vermont
American essayists
Wesleyan University faculty
20th-century American poets
American male poets
American male essayists
Rockefeller Fellows
Novelists from Connecticut
20th-century American male writers
The New Yorker people
Dartmouth College faculty
Yale University faculty
Vermont College of Fine Arts faculty
Middlebury College faculty
Franklin University faculty
21st-century American poets
21st-century American male writers
Writers from Philadelphia
Poets from Pennsylvania
Fulbright alumni